The 2018–19 season was Watford's 120th year in their history and fourth consecutive season in the Premier League; their 11th-placed finish in the league was their highest to date in the Premier League era. They also participated in the EFL Cup and FA Cup, reaching the final of the latter before losing to Man City.

The season covers the period from 1 July 2018 to 30 June 2019.

Transfers

Transfers in

Loans in

Transfers out

Loans out

Friendlies
Watford confirmed pre-season friendlies with 1. FC Köln, Fortuna Düsseldorf, Stevenage, Brentford and Sampdoria.

Competitions

Premier League

League table

Results by matchday

Matches
On 14 June 2018, the Premier League fixtures for the forthcoming season were announced.

FA Cup
The third round draw was made live on BBC by Ruud Gullit and Paul Ince from Stamford Bridge on 3 December 2018. The fourth round draw was made live on BBC by Robbie Keane and Carl Ikeme from Wolverhampton on 7 January 2019. The fifth round draw was broadcast on 28 January 2019 live on BBC, Alex Scott and Ian Wright conducted the draw. The draw for the quarter-finals was made on 18 February by Darren Fletcher & Wayne Bridge.

EFL Cup
The second round draw was made from the Stadium of Light on 16 August. The third round draw was made on 30 August 2018 by David Seaman and Joleon Lescott.

Appearances and goals

|-
! colspan=14 style=background:#dcdcdc; text-align:center| Goalkeepers

|-
! colspan=14 style=background:#dcdcdc; text-align:center| Defenders

|-
! colspan=14 style=background:#dcdcdc; text-align:center| Midfielders

|-
! colspan=14 style=background:#dcdcdc; text-align:center| Forwards

|-
! colspan=14 style=background:#dcdcdc; text-align:center| Players transferred out during the season

References

Watford
Watford F.C. seasons